Hay Lake, Hay Lakes or Hays Lake may refer to:

Hay Lake, Minnesota, an unorganized territory in Minnesota, United States
Hay Lake 209, an Indian reserve in Alberta, Canada
Hay Lakes, a village in Alberta, Canada
Hays Lake, a lake in Minnesota, United States